Marco Januz "Juno" Sauler (born 5 March 1973) is a basketball coach and former basketball player from the Philippines. He was a former head coach of the De La Salle University Green Archers, a collegiate team in the UAAP. Sauler is currently part of coaching staff of the Magnolia Hotshots in the Philippine Basketball Association.

Early years and playing career
Sauler was born in Baguio on 5 March 1973. His father, Jun, had also played collegiate varsity basketball and is credited with teaching his son the game. Sauler studied in De La Salle Santiago Zobel School from the Preparatory level to High School. In his junior and senior years he played power forward / center in varsity basketball for the Golden Bengals (now known as the Junior Archers) from 1988 to 1990 in the UAAP. In his senior year, he was recruited by a rival UAAP university for its collegiate team but he chose to enroll and try out for De La Salle University instead.

Sauler attended De La Salle University, where he majored in economics. While in college, he played power forward for the De La Salle Green Archers from 1992 to 1994 and led as team captain from 1993 to 1994. On his last year as team captain, the Green Archers reached the finals but lost the championship to UST. Aside from Sauler's varsity presence, his academic performance was also recognized with his thesis paper vying for Best Thesis in Economics.  He was conferred a Bachelor of Arts degree majoring in economics  and was also granted a Loyalty award for being a La Salle student from Preparatory school to college, and a Gawad Magaaral award, specifically the Gawad Br. John Lynam FSC, for sportsmanship and leadership.
In 1997, Sauler played for Wilkins Distillery in the Philippine Basketball League through two conferences. In his second conference, he was simultaneously assistant coach of the team.

Coaching career
Sauler became assistant to Jong Uichico for the De La Salle Green Archers in May 1998 but 6 weeks before the start of the UAAP season, Franz Pumaren took over as head coach. Sauler was in Pumaren's coaching staff for a year.

In October 1998, he moved on to coach the De La Salle collegiate women's basketball team, the Lady Archers. He directed them to win three UAAP championships (1999–2001) and four straight NCRAA titles. Concurrently, Sauler was head coach of the De La Salle – Zobel Junior Archers which would finish in the top 3 for those seasons.

From 2001 to 2002 he was a volunteer coach for the Philippine National Men's Basketball Team in the Asian games under Jong Uichico.

In 2002, he moved on to the professional league where he was hired as assistant to Allan Caidic of the Barangay Ginebra Kings.

Sauler rejoined the De La Salle Green Archers as assistant to Gee Abanilla in October 2011.

He took over as head coach on 8 June 2013, just three weeks before the start of the UAAP season 76. In his rookie season at the helm of the Green Archers, Sauler led the team to sweep the second round eliminations and make it to the finals. He subsequently led the team to win the championship against the University of Santo Tomas Growling Tigers in a final deciding game in overtime.

After UAAP season 76, Sauler and deputy coaches Allan Caidic and Jun Limpot observed the training camp of the San Antonio Spurs and practices of the University of Texas Longhorns. This was followed by a 5-day comprehensive development program in the New South Wales Institute of Sport in Australia.

After the UAAP the DLSU Green Archers won the National Championship in Philippine Collegiate Basketball after defeating SWU in the finals of the 2013–2014 season of the Philippine Collegiate Champions League (PCCL).

More recently, the DLSU Green Archers won the 2014 FilOil Flying V Hanes Premier Cup preseason tournament by defeating NCAA champions, the San Beda College Red Lions.

At various times since starting coaching, Sauler attended seminars and observerships under Mike D'Antoni (Phoenix Suns), Mike Dunleavy, Sr. (Los Angeles Clippers), Bill Guthridge (University of North Carolina), Phil Jackson (Los Angeles Lakers), Bob Knight (Indiana University), Mike Krzyzewski (Duke University), Lute Olsen (University of Arizona) and Paul Westphal (Pepperdine University).

On 24 November 2015, DLSU confirmed the resignation of Sauler as head coach of De La Salle Green Archers.

Awards
After the UAAP and NCAA seasons, Sauler together with Coach Boyet Fernandez of the San Beda Red Lions, shared the Coach of the Year award of the 2013 Collegiate Basketball Awards hosted by the UAAP-NCAA Press Corps and SMART telecommunications.

Sauler also won the Best Coach award for PCCL 2013.

Personal life
Sauler met his wife, Agnes Apostol, while they were classmates in De La Salle Zobel. They have two children, Lauren Marie and Santiago Mari. His wife Agnes, was formerly an assistant lecturer at the DLSU School of Economics but is currently working as a VP of HSBC. His daughter Lauren is with the De La Salle Zobel Softball team, and his son Santi plays basketball in the De La Salle Zobel Grade School division. Sauler is second of four children. His sister Rhia is a doctor at the De La Salle University Medical Center. His sister Rica is a professor with the School of Economics of De La Salle University. His brother Nino also played power forward for De La Salle – Zobel.  Sauler's sister-in-law, Aissa, is a teacher in De La Salle Zobel and her husband Adonis Santa Maria is a former professional basketball player who also suited up for the DLSU Green Archers.

Collegiate record

References

External links
Yahoo Sports Philippines College Hoops Experts' Blog

1973 births
Living people
Filipino men's basketball players
Filipino men's basketball coaches
De La Salle Green Archers basketball players
Sportspeople from Baguio
Basketball players from Benguet
Barangay Ginebra San Miguel coaches
Magnolia Hotshots coaches
De La Salle Green Archers basketball coaches